Cheryl Weaver (born March 22, 1980) is an American former indoor volleyball player.

She played for the United States women's national volleyball team, at the 2002 FIVB World Grand Prix.

Life
She played for Long Beach State University.

Clubs

References

External links
 
 http://www.cev.lu/Competition-Area/PlayerDetails.aspx?TeamID=546&PlayerID=14661&ID=29
 https://lbpost.com/sports/12330-long-beach-state-athletics-department-hall-of-fame-inductees

1980 births
Living people
American women's volleyball players
African-American volleyball players
Expatriate volleyball players in Switzerland
Expatriate volleyball players in Azerbaijan
American expatriate sportspeople in Switzerland
American expatriate sportspeople in Azerbaijan
21st-century African-American sportspeople
21st-century African-American women
20th-century African-American people
Long Beach State Beach women's volleyball players
20th-century African-American women